The Maltese National Regatta is a rowing regatta held bi-annually on 31 March Freedom Day  to commemorate the withdrawal of the British troops and the Royal Navy from Malta and on 8 September Victory Day respectively. The Regatta pitches 7 participants against each other over 11 Malta Traditional Regatta Races of 1,040 meters each spanning two categories and the women race. The Regatta is held in the Grand Harbour and being a national event, it draws thousands of spectators year after year.

Format of competition 
Rowers from seven different clubs compete in two categories. The 'Open' Category is dedicated to professional rowers whereas Category 'B' is intended for up-and-coming inexperienced rowers. Each category comprises five races and the club which obtains the highest number of points from the five races wins the respective category. 

Each race features a different rowing boat and points are awarded to the first three placings. The number of points tends to vary from one race to another, with the largest number of points assigned to the last race, thus ensuring that the competition remains interesting to the very end.

On 8 September 2018 under the presidency of the newly elected president Mr. Stephen Paris the women's race took place again after 40 years.  For these races there is also a shield that is won by the winners and kept for a year.

Participants 
 Bormla Regatta Club
 Birzebbuga Regatta Club
 Birgu Regatta Club 
 Kalkara Regatta Club
 Marsa Regatta Club
 Marsamxett Regatta Club
 Senglea Regatta Club

References

External links
 
 Malta Rowing Association
 https://www.whatson.com.mt/en/home/events/16993/31st-march-regatta.htm
 https://www.independent.com.mt/articles/2019-07-03/sports-others/Annual-Regatta-Youths-to-be-held-on-6-July-in-Rinella-Bay-Kalkara-6736210385
 https://www.facebook.com/maltaregatta/

Rowing competitions in Malta